The Supreme Court of the United States (SCOTUS) is the highest court in the federal judiciary of the United States. It has ultimate appellate jurisdiction over all federal court cases, and over state court cases that involve a point of U.S. Constitutional or federal law. It also has original jurisdiction over a narrow range of cases, specifically "all Cases affecting Ambassadors, other public Ministers and Consuls, and those in which a State shall be Party." The court holds the power of judicial review, the ability to invalidate a statute for violating a provision of the Constitution. It is also able to strike down presidential directives for violating either the Constitution or statutory law. However, it may act only within the context of a case in an area of law over which it has jurisdiction. The court may decide cases having political overtones, but has ruled that it does not have power to decide non-justiciable political questions.

Established by Article Three of the United States Constitution, the composition and procedures of the Supreme Court were initially established by the 1st Congress through the Judiciary Act of 1789. As later set by the Judiciary Act of 1869, the court consists of the chief justice of the United States and eight associate justices. Justices have lifetime tenure, meaning they remain on the court until they die, retire, resign, or are impeached and removed from office. When a vacancy occurs, the president, with the advice and consent of the Senate, appoints a new justice. Each justice has a single vote in deciding the cases argued before the court. When in majority, the chief justice decides who writes the opinion of the court; otherwise, the most senior justice in the majority assigns the task of writing the opinion.

The court meets in the Supreme Court Building in Washington, D.C.

History

It was while debating the separation of powers between the legislative and executive departments that delegates to the 1787 Constitutional Convention established the parameters for the national judiciary. Creating a "third branch" of government was a novel idea; in the English tradition, judicial matters had been treated as an aspect of royal (executive) authority. Early on, the delegates who were opposed to having a strong central government argued that national laws could be enforced by state courts, while others, including James Madison, advocated for a national judicial authority consisting of tribunals chosen by the national legislature. It was proposed that the judiciary should have a role in checking the executive's power to veto or revise laws.

Eventually, the framers compromised by sketching only a general outline of the judiciary in Article Three of the United States Constitution, vesting federal judicial power in "one supreme Court, and in such inferior Courts as the Congress may from time to time ordain and establish." They delineated neither the exact powers and prerogatives of the Supreme Court nor the organization of the judicial branch as a whole.

The 1st United States Congress provided the detailed organization of a federal judiciary through the Judiciary Act of 1789. The Supreme Court, the country's highest judicial tribunal, was to sit in the nation's capital and would initially be composed of a chief justice and five associate justices. The act also divided the country into judicial districts, which were in turn organized into circuits. Justices were required to "ride circuit" and hold circuit court twice a year in their assigned judicial district.

Immediately after signing the act into law, President George Washington nominated the following people to serve on the court: John Jay for chief justice and John Rutledge, William Cushing, Robert H. Harrison, James Wilson, and John Blair Jr. as associate justices. All six were confirmed by the Senate on September 26, 1789; however, Harrison declined to serve, and Washington later nominated James Iredell in his place.

The Supreme Court held its inaugural session from February 2 through February 10, 1790, at the Royal Exchange in New York City, then the U.S. capital. A second session was held there in August 1790. The earliest sessions of the court were devoted to organizational proceedings, as the first cases did not reach it until 1791. When the nation's capital was moved to Philadelphia in 1790, the Supreme Court did so as well. After initially meeting at Independence Hall, the court established its chambers at City Hall.

Early beginnings

Under chief justices Jay, Rutledge, and Ellsworth (1789–1801), the court heard few cases; its first decision was West v. Barnes (1791), a case involving procedure. As the court initially had only six members, every decision that it made by a majority was also made by two-thirds (voting four to two). However, Congress has always allowed less than the court's full membership to make decisions, starting with a quorum of four justices in 1789. The court lacked a home of its own and had little prestige, a situation not helped by the era's highest-profile case, Chisholm v. Georgia (1793), which was reversed within two years by the adoption of the Eleventh Amendment.

The court's power and prestige grew substantially during the Marshall Court (1801–1835). Under Marshall, the court established the power of judicial review over acts of Congress, including specifying itself as the supreme expositor of the Constitution (Marbury v. Madison) and making several important constitutional rulings that gave shape and substance to the balance of power between the federal government and states, notably Martin v. Hunter's Lessee, McCulloch v. Maryland, and Gibbons v. Ogden.

The Marshall Court also ended the practice of each justice issuing his opinion seriatim, a remnant of British tradition, and instead issuing a single majority opinion. Also during Marshall's tenure, although beyond the court's control, the impeachment and acquittal of Justice Samuel Chase from 1804 to 1805 helped cement the principle of judicial independence.

From Taney to Taft

The Taney Court (1836–1864) made several important rulings, such as Sheldon v. Sill, which held that while Congress may not limit the subjects the Supreme Court may hear, it may limit the jurisdiction of the lower federal courts to prevent them from hearing cases dealing with certain subjects. Nevertheless, it is primarily remembered for its ruling in Dred Scott v. Sandford, which helped precipitate the American Civil War. In the Reconstruction era, the Chase, Waite, and Fuller Courts (1864–1910) interpreted the new Civil War amendments to the Constitution and developed the doctrine of substantive due process (Lochner v. New York; Adair v. United States). It was in 1869 that the size of the court last changed, being set at nine.

Under the White and Taft Courts (1910–1930), the court held that the Fourteenth Amendment had incorporated some guarantees of the Bill of Rights against the states (Gitlow v. New York), grappled with the new antitrust statutes (Standard Oil Co. of New Jersey v. United States), upheld the constitutionality of military conscription (Selective Draft Law Cases), and brought the substantive due process doctrine to its first apogee (Adkins v. Children's Hospital).

New Deal era

During the Hughes, Stone, and Vinson courts (1930–1953), the court gained its own accommodation in 1935 and changed its interpretation of the Constitution, giving a broader reading to the powers of the federal government to facilitate President Franklin D. Roosevelt's New Deal (most prominently West Coast Hotel Co. v. Parrish, Wickard v. Filburn, United States v. Darby, and United States v. Butler). During World War II, the court continued to favor government power, upholding the internment of Japanese Americans (Korematsu v. United States) and the mandatory Pledge of Allegiance (Minersville School District v. Gobitis). Nevertheless, Gobitis was soon repudiated (West Virginia State Board of Education v. Barnette), and the Steel Seizure Case restricted the pro-government trend.

The Warren Court (1953–1969) dramatically expanded the force of Constitutional civil liberties. It held that segregation in public schools violates the Equal Protection Clause of the Fourteenth Amendment (Brown v. Board of Education, Bolling v. Sharpe, and Green v. County School Bd.) and that legislative districts must be roughly equal in population (Reynolds v. Sims). It created a general right to privacy (Griswold v. Connecticut), limited the role of religion in public school, most prominently Engel v. Vitale and Abington School District v. Schempp, incorporated most guarantees of the Bill of Rights against the states, prominently Mapp v. Ohio (the exclusionary rule) and Gideon v. Wainwright (right to appointed counsel), and required that criminal suspects be apprised of all these rights by police (Miranda v. Arizona). At the same time, the court limited defamation suits by public figures (New York Times Co. v. Sullivan) and supplied the government with an unbroken run of antitrust victories.

Burger, Rehnquist, and Roberts

The Burger Court (1969–1986) saw a conservative shift. It also expanded Griswolds right to privacy to strike down abortion laws (Roe v. Wade) but divided deeply on affirmative action (Regents of the University of California v. Bakke) and campaign finance regulation (Buckley v. Valeo). It also wavered on the death penalty, ruling first that most applications were defective (Furman v. Georgia), but later that the death penalty itself was not unconstitutional (Gregg v. Georgia).

The Rehnquist Court (1986–2005) was known for its revival of judicial enforcement of federalism, emphasizing the limits of the Constitution's affirmative grants of power (United States v. Lopez) and the force of its restrictions on those powers (Seminole Tribe v. Florida, City of Boerne v. Flores). It struck down single-sex state schools as a violation of equal protection (United States v. Virginia), laws against sodomy as violations of substantive due process (Lawrence v. Texas) and the line-item veto (Clinton v. New York) but upheld school vouchers (Zelman v. Simmons-Harris) and reaffirmed Roes restrictions on abortion laws (Planned Parenthood v. Casey). The court's decision in Bush v. Gore, which ended the electoral recount during the 2000 United States presidential election, was especially controversial.

The Roberts Court (2005–present) is regarded as more conservative than the Rehnquist Court. Some of its major rulings have concerned federal preemption (Wyeth v. Levine), civil procedure (Twombly–Iqbal), voting rights and federal preclearance (Shelby County–Brnovich), abortion (Gonzales v. Carhart and Dobbs v. Jackson Women's Health Organization), climate change (Massachusetts v. EPA), same-sex marriage (United States v. Windsor and Obergefell v. Hodges), and the Bill of Rights, such as in Citizens United v. Federal Election Commission and Americans for Prosperity Foundation v. Bonta (First Amendment), Heller–McDonald–Bruen (Second Amendment), and Baze v. Rees (Eighth Amendment).

Composition

Nomination, confirmation, and appointment

Article II, Section 2, Clause 2 of the United States Constitution, known as the Appointments Clause, empowers the president to nominate and, with the confirmation (advice and consent) of the United States Senate, to appoint public officials, including justices of the Supreme Court. This clause is one example of the system of checks and balances inherent in the Constitution. The president has the plenary power to nominate, while the Senate possesses the plenary power to reject or confirm the nominee. The Constitution sets no qualifications for service as a justice, thus a president may nominate anyone to serve, and the Senate may not set any qualifications or otherwise limit who the president can choose.

In modern times, the confirmation process has attracted considerable attention from the press and advocacy groups, which lobby senators to confirm or to reject a nominee depending on whether their track record aligns with the group's views. The Senate Judiciary Committee conducts hearings and votes on whether the nomination should go to the full Senate with a positive, negative or neutral report. The committee's practice of personally interviewing nominees is relatively recent. The first nominee to appear before the committee was Harlan Fiske Stone in 1925, who sought to quell concerns about his links to Wall Street, and the modern practice of questioning began with John Marshall Harlan II in 1955. Once the committee reports out the nomination, the full Senate considers it. Rejections are relatively uncommon; the Senate has explicitly rejected twelve Supreme Court nominees, most recently Robert Bork, nominated by President Ronald Reagan in 1987.

Although Senate rules do not necessarily allow a negative or tied vote in committee to block a nomination, prior to 2017 a nomination could be blocked by filibuster once debate had begun in the full Senate. President Lyndon B. Johnson's nomination of sitting associate justice Abe Fortas to succeed Earl Warren as Chief Justice in 1968 was the first successful filibuster of a Supreme Court nominee. It included both Republican and Democratic senators concerned with Fortas's ethics. President Donald Trump's nomination of Neil Gorsuch to the seat left vacant by Antonin Scalia's death was the second. Unlike the Fortas filibuster, only Democratic senators voted against cloture on the Gorsuch nomination, citing his perceived conservative judicial philosophy, and the Republican majority's prior refusal to take up President Barack Obama's nomination of Merrick Garland to fill the vacancy. This led the Republican majority to change the rules and eliminate the filibuster for Supreme Court nominations.

Not every Supreme Court nominee has received a floor vote in the Senate. A president may withdraw a nomination before an actual confirmation vote occurs, typically because it is clear that the Senate will reject the nominee; this occurred with President George W. Bush's nomination of Harriet Miers in 2005. The Senate may also fail to act on a nomination, which expires at the end of the session. President Dwight Eisenhower's first nomination of John Marshall Harlan II in November 1954 was not acted on by the Senate; Eisenhower re-nominated Harlan in January 1955, and Harlan was confirmed two months later. Most recently, the Senate failed to act on the March 2016 nomination of Merrick Garland, as the nomination expired in January 2017, and the vacancy was filled by Neil Gorsuch, an appointee of President Trump.

Once the Senate confirms a nomination, the president must prepare and sign a commission, to which the Seal of the Department of Justice must be affixed, before the appointee can take office. The seniority of an associate justice is based on the commissioning date, not the confirmation or swearing-in date. After receiving their commission, the appointee must then take the two prescribed oaths before assuming their official duties. The importance of the oath taking is underscored by the case of Edwin M. Stanton. Although confirmed by the Senate on December 20, 1869, and duly commissioned as an associate justice by President Ulysses S. Grant, Stanton died on December 24, prior to taking the prescribed oaths. He is not, therefore, considered to have been a member of the court.

Before 1981, the approval process of justices was usually rapid. From the Truman through Nixon administrations, justices were typically approved within one month. From the Reagan administration to the present, the process has taken much longer and some believe this is because Congress sees justices as playing a more political role than in the past. According to the Congressional Research Service, the average number of days from nomination to final Senate vote since 1975 is 67 days (2.2 months), while the median is 71 days (2.3 months).

Recess appointments
When the Senate is in recess, a president may make temporary appointments to fill vacancies. Recess appointees hold office only until the end of the next Senate session (less than two years). The Senate must confirm the nominee for them to continue serving; of the two chief justices and eleven associate justices who have received recess appointments, only Chief Justice John Rutledge was not subsequently confirmed.

No U.S. president since Dwight D. Eisenhower has made a recess appointment to the court, and the practice has become rare and controversial even in lower federal courts. In 1960, after Eisenhower had made three such appointments, the Senate passed a "sense of the Senate" resolution that recess appointments to the court should only be made in "unusual circumstances"; such resolutions are not legally binding but are an expression of Congress's views in the hope of guiding executive action.

The Supreme Court's 2014 decision in National Labor Relations Board v. Noel Canning limited the ability of the president to make recess appointments (including appointments to the Supreme Court); the court ruled that the Senate decides when the Senate is in session or in recess. Writing for the court, Justice Breyer stated, "We hold that, for purposes of the Recess Appointments Clause, the Senate is in session when it says it is, provided that, under its own rules, it retains the capacity to transact Senate business." This ruling allows the Senate to prevent recess appointments through the use of pro-forma sessions.

Tenure

Article Three, Section 1 of the Constitution provides that justices "shall hold their offices during good behavior", which is understood to mean that they may serve for the remainder of their lives, until death; furthermore, the phrase is generally interpreted to mean that the only way justices can be removed from office is by Congress via the impeachment process. The Framers of the Constitution chose good behavior tenure to limit the power to remove justices and to ensure judicial independence. No constitutional mechanism exists for removing a justice who is permanently incapacitated by illness or injury, but unable (or unwilling) to resign. The only justice ever to be impeached was Samuel Chase, in 1804. The House of Representatives adopted eight articles of impeachment against him; however, he was acquitted by the Senate, and remained in office until his death in 1811. No subsequent effort to impeach a sitting justice has progressed beyond referral to the Judiciary Committee. (For example, William O. Douglas was the subject of hearings twice, in 1953 and again in 1970; and Abe Fortas resigned while hearings were being organized in 1969.)

Because justices have indefinite tenure, timing of vacancies can be unpredictable. Sometimes they arise in quick succession, as in September 1971, when Hugo Black and John Marshall Harlan II left within days of each other, the shortest period of time between vacancies in the court's history. Sometimes a great length of time passes between vacancies, such as the 11-year span, from 1994 to 2005, from the retirement of Harry Blackmun to the death of William Rehnquist, which was the second longest timespan between vacancies in the court's history. On average a new justice joins the court about every two years.

Despite the variability, all but four presidents have been able to appoint at least one justice. William Henry Harrison died a month after taking office, although his successor (John Tyler) made an appointment during that presidential term. Likewise, Zachary Taylor died 16 months after taking office, but his successor (Millard Fillmore) also made a Supreme Court nomination before the end of that term. Andrew Johnson, who became president after the assassination of Abraham Lincoln, was denied the opportunity to appoint a justice by a reduction in the size of the court. Jimmy Carter is the only person elected president to have left office after at least one full term without having the opportunity to appoint a justice. Presidents James Monroe, Franklin D. Roosevelt, and George W. Bush each served a full term without an opportunity to appoint a justice, but made appointments during their subsequent terms in office. No president who has served more than one full term has gone without at least one opportunity to make an appointment.

Size of the court
The U.S. Supreme Court currently consists of nine members: one chief justice and eight associate justices. The U.S. Constitution does not specify the size of the Supreme Court, nor does it specify any specific positions for the court's members. However, the Constitution assumes the existence of the office of the chief justice, because it mentions in Article I, Section 3, Clause 6 that "the Chief Justice" must preside over impeachment trials of the President of the United States. The power to define the Supreme Court's size and membership has been assumed to belong to Congress, which initially established a six-member Supreme Court composed of a chief justice and five associate justices through the Judiciary Act of 1789. The size of the court was first altered by the Midnight Judges Act of 1801 which would have reduced the size of the court to five members upon its next vacancy, but the Judiciary Act of 1802 promptly negated the 1801 act, restoring the court's size to six members before any such vacancy occurred. As the nation's boundaries grew across the continent and as Supreme Court justices in those days had to ride the circuit, an arduous process requiring long travel on horseback or carriage over harsh terrain that resulted in months-long extended stays away from home, Congress added justices to correspond with the growth: seven in 1807, nine in 1837, and ten in 1863.

At the behest of Chief Justice Chase and in an attempt by the Republican Congress to limit the power of Democrat Andrew Johnson, Congress passed the Judicial Circuits Act of 1866, providing that the next three justices to retire would not be replaced, which would thin the bench to seven justices by attrition. Consequently, one seat was removed in 1866 and a second in 1867. Soon after Johnson left office, the new president Ulysses S. Grant, a Republican, signed into law the Judiciary Act of 1869. This returned the number of justices to nine (where it has since remained), and allowed Grant to immediately appoint two more judges.

President Franklin D. Roosevelt attempted to expand the court in 1937. His proposal envisioned the appointment of one additional justice for each incumbent justice who reached the age of 70years 6months and refused retirement, up to a maximum bench of 15 justices. The proposal was ostensibly to ease the burden of the docket on elderly judges, but the actual purpose was widely understood as an effort to "pack" the court with justices who would support Roosevelt's New Deal. The plan, usually called the "court-packing plan", failed in Congress after members of Roosevelt's own Democratic Party believed it to be unconstitutional. It was defeated 70–20 in the Senate, and the Senate Judiciary Committee reported that it was "essential to the continuance of our constitutional democracy" that the proposal "be so emphatically rejected that its parallel will never again be presented to the free representatives of the free people of America."

The rise and solidification of a conservative majority on the court during the presidency of Donald Trump sparked a liberal response in the form of calls for court-packing. Democrats in the House of Representatives introduced a bill in April 2021 to expand the Supreme Court from nine to 13 seats, but Speaker of the House Nancy Pelosi refused to bring it to the floor and relatively few Democrats backed it. Shortly after taking office in January 2021, Joe Biden established a presidential commission to study possible reforms to the Supreme Court. The commission's December 2021 final report discussed but took no position on expanding the size of the court. Whether it would be constitutional to expand the size of the Supreme Court in ways understood to be designed to "pack" it with justices that would rule more favorably on a president's agenda or to simply change the ideological composition of the court remains unclear.

Membership

Current justices
There are currently nine justices on the Supreme Court: Chief Justice John Roberts and eight associate justices.

This graphical timeline depicts the length of each current Supreme Court justice's tenure (not seniority, as the chief justice has seniority over all associate justices regardless of tenure) on the court:

Court demographics

The court currently has five male and four female justices. Among the nine justices, there are two African American justices (Justices Thomas and Jackson) and one Hispanic justice (Justice Sotomayor). One of the justices was born to at least one immigrant parent: Justice Alito's father was born in Italy.

At least six justices are Roman Catholics, one is Jewish, and one is Protestant. It is unclear whether Neil Gorsuch considers himself a Catholic or an Episcopalian. Historically, most justices have been Protestants, including 36 Episcopalians, 19 Presbyterians, 10 Unitarians, 5 Methodists, and 3 Baptists. The first Catholic justice was Roger Taney in 1836, and 1916 saw the appointment of the first Jewish justice, Louis Brandeis. In recent years the historical situation has reversed, as most recent justices have been either Catholic or Jewish.

Three justices are from the state of New York, two are from Washington, D.C., and one each is from New Jersey, Georgia, Colorado, and Louisiana. Eight of the current justices received their law degree from an Ivy League law school: Neil Gorsuch, Ketanji Brown Jackson, Elena Kagan and John Roberts from Harvard; plus Samuel Alito, Brett Kavanaugh, Sonia Sotomayor and Clarence Thomas from Yale. Only Amy Coney Barrett did not; she received her law degree at Notre Dame.

Previous positions or offices, judicial or federal government, held by the current justices prior to joining the court include:

For much of the court's history, every justice was a man of Northwestern European descent, and almost always Protestant. Diversity concerns focused on geography, to represent all regions of the country, rather than religious, ethnic, or gender diversity. Racial, ethnic, and gender diversity in the court increased in the late 20th century. Thurgood Marshall became the first African-American justice in 1967. Sandra Day O'Connor became the first female justice in 1981. In 1986, Antonin Scalia became the first Italian-American justice. Marshall was succeeded by African-American Clarence Thomas in 1991. O'Connor was joined by Ruth Bader Ginsburg, the first Jewish woman on the Court, in 1993. After O'Connor's retirement Ginsburg was joined in 2009 by Sonia Sotomayor, the first Hispanic and Latina justice, and in 2010 by Elena Kagan. After Ginsburg's death on September 18, 2020, Amy Coney Barrett was confirmed as the fifth woman in the court's history on October 26, 2020. Ketanji Brown Jackson is the sixth woman and first African-American woman on the court.

There have been six foreign-born justices in the court's history: James Wilson (1789–1798), born in Caskardy, Scotland; James Iredell (1790–1799), born in Lewes, England; William Paterson (1793–1806), born in County Antrim, Ireland; David Brewer (1889–1910), born to American missionaries in Smyrna, Ottoman Empire (now Izmir, Turkey); George Sutherland (1922–1939), born in Buckinghamshire, England; and Felix Frankfurter (1939–1962), born in Vienna, Austria-Hungary (now in Austria).

Since 1789, about one-third of the justices have been U.S. military veterans. Samuel Alito is the only veteran currently serving on the court. Retired justices Stephen Breyer and Anthony Kennedy also served in the U.S. military.

Retired justices
There are currently four living retired justices of the Supreme Court of the United States: Sandra Day O'Connor, Anthony Kennedy, David Souter, and Stephen Breyer. As retired justices, they no longer participate in the work of the Supreme Court, but may be designated for temporary assignments to sit on lower federal courts, usually the United States Courts of Appeals. Such assignments are formally made by the chief justice, on request of the chief judge of the lower court and with the consent of the retired justice. In recent years, Justice Souter has frequently sat on the First Circuit, the court of which he was briefly a member before joining the Supreme Court; and Justice O'Connor often sat with several Courts of Appeal before withdrawing from public life in 2018. The status of a retired justice is analogous to that of a circuit or district court judge who has taken senior status, and eligibility of a Supreme Court justice to assume retired status (rather than simply resign from the bench) is governed by the same age and service criteria.

In recent times, justices tend to strategically plan their decisions to leave the bench with personal, institutional, ideological, partisan and sometimes even political factors playing a role. The fear of mental decline and death often motivates justices to step down. The desire to maximize the court's strength and legitimacy through one retirement at a time, when the court is in recess and during non-presidential election years suggests a concern for institutional health. Finally, especially in recent decades, many justices have timed their departure to coincide with a philosophically compatible president holding office, to ensure that a like-minded successor would be appointed.

Seniority and seating

For the most part, the day-to-day activities of the justices are governed by rules of protocol based upon the seniority of justices. The chief justice always ranks first in the order of precedence—regardless of the length of their service. The associate justices are then ranked by the length of their service. The chief justice sits in the center on the bench, or at the head of the table during conferences. The other justices are seated in order of seniority. The senior-most associate justice sits immediately to the chief justice's right; the second most senior sits immediately to their left. The seats alternate right to left in order of seniority, with the most junior justice occupying the last seat. Therefore, starting with the October 2022 term, the court will sit as follows from left to right, from the perspective of those facing the court: Barrett, Gorsuch, Sotomayor, Thomas (most senior associate justice), Roberts (chief justice), Alito, Kagan, Kavanaugh, and Jackson. Likewise, when the members of the court gather for official group photographs, justices are arranged in order of seniority, with the five most senior members seated in the front row in the same order as they would sit during Court sessions, and the four most junior justices standing behind them, again in the same order as they would sit during Court sessions.

In the justices' private conferences, current practice is for them to speak and vote in order of seniority, beginning with the chief justice first and ending with the most junior associate justice. By custom, the most junior associate justice in these conferences is charged with any menial tasks the justices may require as they convene alone, such as answering the door of their conference room, serving beverages and transmitting orders of the court to the clerk.

Salary

As of 2021, associate justices receive a yearly salary of $268,300 and the chief justice is paid $280,500 per year. Article III, Section 1 of the U.S. Constitution prohibits Congress from reducing the pay for incumbent justices. Once a justice meets age and service requirements, the justice may retire. Judicial pensions are based on the same formula used for federal employees, but a justice's pension, as with other federal courts judges, can never be less than their salary at the time of retirement.

Judicial leanings

Although justices are nominated by the president in power, and receive confirmation by the Senate, justices do not represent or receive official endorsements from political parties, as is accepted practice in the legislative and executive branches. Jurists are informally categorized in legal and political circles as being judicial conservatives, moderates, or liberals. Such leanings generally refer to legal outlook rather than a political or legislative one. The nominations of justices are endorsed by individual politicians in the legislative branch who vote their approval or disapproval of the nominated justice. The ideologies of jurists can be measured and compared with several metrics, including the Segal–Cover score, Martin-Quinn score, and Judicial Common Space score.

Following the confirmation of Ketanji Brown Jackson in 2022, the court consists of six justices appointed by Republican presidents and three appointed by Democratic presidents. It is popularly accepted that Chief Justice Roberts and associate justices Thomas, Alito, Gorsuch, Kavanaugh, and Barrett, appointed by Republican presidents, compose the court's conservative wing, and that Justices Sotomayor and Kagan, appointed by Democratic presidents, compose the court's liberal wing; Justice Jackson is expected to join them. Gorsuch had a track record as a reliably conservative judge in the 10th circuit. Kavanaugh was considered one of the most conservative judges in the DC Circuit prior to his appointment to the Supreme Court. Likewise, Barrett's brief track record on the Seventh Circuit is conservative.
Prior to Justice Ginsburg's death, Chief Justice Roberts was considered the court's median justice (in the middle of the ideological spectrum, with four justices more liberal and four more conservative than him), making him the ideological center of the court. Since Ginsburg's death and Barrett's confirmation, Kavanaugh is the court's median justice, based on the criterion that he has been in the majority more than any other justice.

Tom Goldstein argued in an article in SCOTUSblog in 2010, that the popular view of the Supreme Court as sharply divided along ideological lines and each side pushing an agenda at every turn is "in significant part a caricature designed to fit certain preconceptions." He pointed out that in the 2009 term, almost half the cases were decided unanimously, and only about 20% were decided by a 5-to-4 vote. Barely one in ten cases involved the narrow liberal/conservative divide (fewer if the cases where Sotomayor recused herself are not included). He also pointed to several cases that defied the popular conception of the ideological lines of the court.
Goldstein further argued that the large number of pro-criminal-defendant summary dismissals (usually cases where the justices decide that the lower courts significantly misapplied precedent and reverse the case without briefing or argument) were an illustration that the conservative justices had not been aggressively ideological. Likewise, Goldstein stated that the critique that the liberal justices are more likely to invalidate acts of Congress, show inadequate deference to the political process, and be disrespectful of precedent, also lacked merit: Thomas has most often called for overruling prior precedent (even if long standing) that he views as having been wrongly decided, and during the 2009 term Scalia and Thomas voted most often to invalidate legislation.

According to statistics compiled by SCOTUSblog, in the twelve terms from 2000 to 2011, an average of 19 of the opinions on major issues (22%) were decided by a 5–4 vote, with an average of 70% of those split opinions decided by a court divided along the traditionally perceived ideological lines (about 15% of all opinions issued). Over that period, the conservative bloc has been in the majority about 62% of the time that the court has divided along ideological lines, which represents about 44% of all the 5–4 decisions.

In the October 2010 term, the court decided 86 cases, including 75 signed opinions and 5 summary reversals (where the court reverses a lower court without arguments and without issuing an opinion on the case). Four were decided with unsigned opinions, two cases affirmed by an equally divided Court, and two cases were dismissed as improvidently granted. Justice Kagan recused herself from 26 of the cases due to her prior role as United States Solicitor General. Of the 80 cases, 38 (about 48%, the highest percentage since the October 2005 term) were decided unanimously (9–0 or 8–0), and 16 decisions were made by a 5–4 vote (about 20%, compared to 18% in the October 2009 term, and 29% in the October 2008 term). However, in fourteen of the sixteen 5–4 decisions, the court divided along the traditional ideological lines (with Ginsburg, Breyer, Sotomayor, and Kagan on the liberal side, and Roberts, Scalia, Thomas, and Alito on the conservative, and Kennedy providing the "swing vote"). This represents 87% of those 16 cases, the highest rate in the past 10 years. The conservative bloc, joined by Kennedy, formed the majority in 63% of the 5–4 decisions, the highest cohesion rate of that bloc in the Roberts Court.

The October 2017 term had a low rate of unanimous rulings, with only 39% of the cases decided by unanimous rulings, the lowest percentage since the October 2008 term when 30% of rulings were unanimous. Chief Justice Roberts was in the majority most often (68 out of 73 cases, or 93.2%), with retiring Justice Anthony Kennedy in second (67 out of 73 cases, or 91.8%); this was typical of the Roberts Court, in which Roberts and Kennedy have been in the majority most frequently in all terms except for the 2013 and 2014 terms (though Kennedy was in the top on both those terms). Justice Sotomayor was the justice least likely to be in the majority (in 50 out of 73 cases, or 68.5%). The highest agreement between justices was between Ginsburg and Sotomayor, who agreed on 95.8% of the cases, followed by Thomas and Alito agreeing on 93% of cases. There were 19 cases that were decided by a 5–4 vote (26% of the total cases); 74% of those cases (14 out of 19) broke along ideological lines, and for the first time in the Roberts Court, all of those resulted in a conservative majority, with Roberts, Kennedy, Thomas, Alito, and Gorsuch on the majority.

The October 2018 term, which saw the replacement of Anthony Kennedy by Brett Kavanaugh, once again saw a low rate of unanimity: only 28 of 71 decided cases were decided by a unanimous court, about 39% of the cases. Of these, only 19 cases had the justices in total agreement. Chief Justice Roberts was once again the justice most often in the majority (61 out of 72 cases, or 85% of the time). Although Kavanaugh had a higher percentage of times in the majority, he did not participate in all cases, voting in the majority 58 out of 64 times, or 91% of the cases in which he participated. Of the justices who participated in all 72 cases, Kagan and Alito tied in second place, voting in the majority 59 out of 72 times (or 82% of the time). Looking only at cases that were not decided unanimously, Roberts and Kavanaugh were the most frequently in the majority (33 cases, with Roberts being in the majority in 75% of the divided cases, and Kavanaugh in 85% of the divided cases he participated in). Of 20 cases that were decided by a vote of 5–4, eight featured the conservative justices in the majority (Roberts, Thomas, Alito, Gorsuch, and Kavanaugh), and eight had the liberal justices (Ginsburg, Breyer, Sotomayor, and Kagan) joined by a conservative: Gorsuch was the most frequent, joining them four times, and the remaining conservative justices joining the liberals once each. The remaining four cases were decided by different coalitions. The highest agreement between justices was between Roberts and Kavanaugh, who agreed at least in judgement 94% of the time; the second highest agreement was again between Ginsburg and Sotomayor, who agreed 93% of the time. The highest rate of full agreement was between Ginsburg and Kagan (82% of the time), closely followed by Roberts and Alito, Ginsburg and Sotomayor, and Breyer and Kagan (81% of the time). The largest rate of disagreement was between Thomas and both Ginsburg and Sotomayor; Thomas disagreed with each of them 50% of the time.

By the completion of the 2021 term, the percent of 6–3 decisions favoring the conservative majority had reached 30%, with the percent of unanimous cases having dropped to the same number.

Facilities

The Supreme Court first met on February 1, 1790, at the Merchants' Exchange Building in New York City. When Philadelphia became the capital, the court met briefly in Independence Hall before settling in Old City Hall from 1791 until 1800. After the government moved to Washington, D.C., the court occupied various spaces in the Capitol building until 1935, when it moved into its own purpose-built home. The four-story building was designed by Cass Gilbert in a classical style sympathetic to the surrounding buildings of the Capitol and Library of Congress, and is clad in marble. The building includes the courtroom, justices' chambers, an extensive law library, various meeting spaces, and auxiliary services including a gymnasium. The Supreme Court building is within the ambit of the Architect of the Capitol, but maintains its own Supreme Court Police, separate from the Capitol Police.

Located across First Street from the United States Capitol at One First Street NE and Maryland Avenue, the building is open to the public from 9am to 4:30pm weekdays but closed on weekends and holidays. Visitors may not tour the actual courtroom unaccompanied. There is a cafeteria, a gift shop, exhibits, and a half-hour informational film. When the court is not in session, lectures about the courtroom are held hourly from 9:30am to 3:30pm and reservations are not necessary. When the court is in session the public may attend oral arguments, which are held twice each morning (and sometimes afternoons) on Mondays, Tuesdays, and Wednesdays in two-week intervals from October through late April, with breaks during December and February. Visitors are seated on a first-come first-served basis. One estimate is there are about 250 seats available. The number of open seats varies from case to case; for important cases, some visitors arrive the day before and wait through the night. From mid-May until the end of June, the court releases orders and opinions beginning at 10am, and these 15 to 30-minute sessions are open to the public on a similar basis. Supreme Court Police are available to answer questions.

Jurisdiction

Congress is authorized by Article III of the federal Constitution to regulate the Supreme Court's appellate jurisdiction. The Supreme Court has original and exclusive jurisdiction over cases between two or more states but may decline to hear such cases. It also possesses original but not exclusive jurisdiction to hear "all actions or proceedings to which ambassadors, other public ministers, consuls, or vice consuls of foreign states are parties; all controversies between the United States and a State; and all actions or proceedings by a State against the citizens of another State or against aliens."

In 1906, the court asserted its original jurisdiction to prosecute individuals for contempt of court in United States v. Shipp. The resulting proceeding remains the only contempt proceeding and only criminal trial in the court's history. The contempt proceeding arose from the lynching of Ed Johnson in Chattanooga, Tennessee the evening after Justice John Marshall Harlan granted Johnson a stay of execution to allow his lawyers to file an appeal. Johnson was removed from his jail cell by a lynch mob, aided by the local sheriff who left the prison virtually unguarded, and hanged from a bridge, after which a deputy sheriff pinned a note on Johnson's body reading: "To Justice Harlan. Come get your nigger now." The local sheriff, John Shipp, cited the Supreme Court's intervention as the rationale for the lynching. The court appointed its deputy clerk as special master to preside over the trial in Chattanooga with closing arguments made in Washington before the Supreme Court justices, who found nine individuals guilty of contempt, sentencing three to 90 days in jail and the rest to 60 days in jail. In all other cases, the court has only appellate jurisdiction, including the ability to issue writs of mandamus and writs of prohibition to lower courts. It considers cases based on its original jurisdiction very rarely; almost all cases are brought to the Supreme Court on appeal. In practice, the only original jurisdiction cases heard by the court are disputes between two or more states.

The court's appellate jurisdiction consists of appeals from federal courts of appeal (through certiorari, certiorari before judgment, and certified questions), the United States Court of Appeals for the Armed Forces (through certiorari), the Supreme Court of Puerto Rico (through certiorari), the Supreme Court of the Virgin Islands (through certiorari), the District of Columbia Court of Appeals (through certiorari), and "final judgments or decrees rendered by the highest court of a State in which a decision could be had" (through certiorari). In the last case, an appeal may be made to the Supreme Court from a lower state court if the state's highest court declined to hear an appeal or lacks jurisdiction to hear an appeal. For example, a decision rendered by one of the Florida District Courts of Appeal can be appealed to the U.S. Supreme Court if (a) the Supreme Court of Florida declined to grant certiorari, e.g. Florida Star v. B. J. F., or (b) the district court of appeal issued a per curiam decision simply affirming the lower court's decision without discussing the merits of the case, since the Supreme Court of Florida lacks jurisdiction to hear appeals of such decisions. The power of the Supreme Court to consider appeals from state courts, rather than just federal courts, was created by the Judiciary Act of 1789 and upheld early in the court's history, by its rulings in Martin v. Hunter's Lessee (1816) and Cohens v. Virginia (1821). The Supreme Court is the only federal court that has jurisdiction over direct appeals from state court decisions, although there are several devices that permit so-called "collateral review" of state cases. It has to be noted that this "collateral review" often only applies to individuals on death row and not through the regular judicial system.

Since Article Three of the United States Constitution stipulates that federal courts may only entertain "cases" or "controversies", the Supreme Court cannot decide cases that are moot and it does not render advisory opinions, as the supreme courts of some states may do. For example, in DeFunis v. Odegaard, the court dismissed a lawsuit challenging the constitutionality of a law school affirmative action policy because the plaintiff student had graduated since he began the lawsuit, and a decision from the court on his claim would not be able to redress any injury he had suffered. However, the court recognizes some circumstances where it is appropriate to hear a case that is seemingly moot. If an issue is "capable of repetition yet evading review", the court would address it even though the party before the court would not themselves be made whole by a favorable result. In Roe v. Wade, and other abortion cases, the court addresses the merits of claims pressed by pregnant women seeking abortions even if they are no longer pregnant because it takes longer than the typical human gestation period to appeal a case through the lower courts to the Supreme Court. Another mootness exception is voluntary cessation of unlawful conduct, in which the court considers the probability of recurrence and plaintiff's need for relief.

Justices as circuit justices
The United States is divided into thirteen circuit courts of appeals, each of which is assigned a "circuit justice" from the Supreme Court. Although this concept has been in continuous existence throughout the history of the republic, its meaning has changed through time. Under the Judiciary Act of 1789, each justice was required to "ride circuit", or to travel within the assigned circuit and consider cases alongside local judges. This practice encountered opposition from many justices, who cited the difficulty of travel. Moreover, there was a potential for a conflict of interest on the court if a justice had previously decided the same case while riding circuit. Circuit riding ended in 1901, when the Circuit Court of Appeals Act was passed, and circuit riding was officially abolished by Congress in 1911.

The circuit justice for each circuit is responsible for dealing with certain types of applications that, under the court's rules, may be addressed by a single justice. These include applications for emergency stays (including stays of execution in death-penalty cases) and injunctions pursuant to the All Writs Act arising from cases within that circuit, and routine requests such as requests for extensions of time. In the past, circuit justices also sometimes ruled on motions for bail in criminal cases, writs of habeas corpus, and applications for writs of error granting permission to appeal. 

A circuit justice may sit as a judge on the Court of Appeals of that circuit, but over the past hundred years, this has rarely occurred. A circuit justice sitting with the Court of Appeals has seniority over the chief judge of the circuit. The chief justice has traditionally been assigned to the District of Columbia Circuit, the Fourth Circuit (which includes Maryland and Virginia, the states surrounding the District of Columbia), and since it was established, the Federal Circuit. Each associate justice is assigned to one or two judicial circuits.

As of September 28, 2022, the allotment of the justices among the circuits is as follows:

Five of the current justices are assigned to circuits on which they previously sat as circuit judges: Chief Justice Roberts (D.C. Circuit), Justice Sotomayor (Second Circuit), Justice Alito (Third Circuit), Justice Barrett (Seventh Circuit), and Justice Gorsuch (Tenth Circuit).

Process

Term
A term of the Supreme Court commences on the first Monday of each October, and continues until June or early July of the following year. Each term consists of alternating periods of around two weeks known as "sittings" and "recesses"; justices hear cases and deliver rulings during sittings, and discuss cases and write opinions during recesses.

Case selection
Nearly all cases come before the court by way of petitions for writs of certiorari, commonly referred to as cert; the court may review any case in the federal courts of appeals "by writ of certiorari granted upon the petition of any party to any civil or criminal case." The court may only review "final judgments rendered by the highest court of a state in which a decision could be had" if those judgments involve a question of federal statutory or constitutional law. The party that appealed to the court is the petitioner and the non-mover is the respondent. All case names before the court are styled petitioner v. respondent, regardless of which party initiated the lawsuit in the trial court. For example, criminal prosecutions are brought in the name of the state and against an individual, as in State of Arizona v. Ernesto Miranda. If the defendant is convicted, and his conviction then is affirmed on appeal in the state supreme court, when he petitions for cert the name of the case becomes Miranda v. Arizona.

There are situations where the court has original jurisdiction, such as when two states have a dispute against each other, or when there is a dispute between the United States and a state. In such instances, a case is filed with the Supreme Court directly. Examples of such cases include United States v. Texas, a case to determine whether a parcel of land belonged to the United States or to Texas, and Virginia v. Tennessee, a case turning on whether an incorrectly drawn boundary between two states can be changed by a state court, and whether the setting of the correct boundary requires Congressional approval. Although it has not happened since 1794 in the case of Georgia v. Brailsford, parties in an action at law in which the Supreme Court has original jurisdiction may request that a jury determine issues of fact. Georgia v. Brailsford remains the only case in which the court has empaneled a jury, in this case a special jury. Two other original jurisdiction cases involve colonial era borders and rights under navigable waters in New Jersey v. Delaware, and water rights between riparian states upstream of navigable waters in Kansas v. Colorado.

A cert petition is voted on at a session of the court called conference. A conference is a private meeting of the nine justices by themselves; the public and the justices' clerks are excluded. The rule of four permits four of the nine justices to grant a writ of certiorari. If it is granted, the case proceeds to the briefing stage; otherwise, the case ends. Except in death penalty cases and other cases in which the court orders briefing from the respondent, the respondent may, but is not required to, file a response to the cert petition. The court grants a petition for cert only for "compelling reasons", spelled out in the court's Rule 10. Such reasons include:
 Resolving a conflict in the interpretation of a federal law or a provision of the federal Constitution
 Correcting an egregious departure from the accepted and usual course of judicial proceedings
 Resolving an important question of federal law, or to expressly review a decision of a lower court that conflicts directly with a previous decision of the court.

When a conflict of interpretations arises from differing interpretations of the same law or constitutional provision issued by different federal circuit courts of appeals, lawyers call this situation a "circuit split"; if the court votes to deny a cert petition, as it does in the vast majority of such petitions that come before it, it does so typically without comment. A denial of a cert petition is not a judgment on the merits of a case, and the decision of the lower court stands as the case's final ruling. To manage the high volume of cert petitions received by the court each year (of the more than 7,000 petitions the court receives each year, it will usually request briefing and hear oral argument in 100 or fewer), the court employs an internal case management tool known as the "cert pool"; currently, all justices except for Justices Alito and Gorsuch participate in the cert pool.

Oral argument

When the court grants a cert petition, the case is set for oral argument. Both parties will file briefs on the merits of the case, as distinct from the reasons they may have argued for granting or denying the cert petition. With the consent of the parties or approval of the court, amici curiae, or "friends of the court", may also file briefs. The court holds two-week oral argument sessions each month from October through April. Each side has thirty minutes to present its argument (the court may choose to give more time, although this is rare), and during that time, the justices may interrupt the advocate and ask questions. In 2019, the court adopted a rule generally allowing advocates to speak uninterrupted for the first two minutes of their argument. The petitioner gives the first presentation, and may reserve some time to rebut the respondent's arguments after the respondent has concluded. Amici curiae may also present oral argument on behalf of one party if that party agrees. The court advises counsel to assume that the justices are familiar with and have read the briefs filed in a case.

Supreme Court bar
In order to plead before the court, an attorney must first be admitted to the court's bar. Approximately 4,000 lawyers join the bar each year. The bar contains an estimated 230,000 members. In reality, pleading is limited to several hundred attorneys. The rest join for a one-time fee of $200, earning the court about $750,000 annually. Attorneys can be admitted as either individuals or as groups. The group admission is held before the current justices of the Supreme Court, wherein the chief justice approves a motion to admit the new attorneys. Lawyers commonly apply for the cosmetic value of a certificate to display in their office or on their resume. They also receive access to better seating if they wish to attend an oral argument. Members of the Supreme Court Bar are also granted access to the collections of the Supreme Court Library.

Decision
At the conclusion of oral argument, the case is submitted for decision. Cases are decided by majority vote of the justices. After the oral argument is concluded, usually in the same week as the case was submitted, the justices retire to another conference at which the preliminary votes are tallied and the court sees which side has prevailed. One of the justices in the majority is then assigned to write the court's opinion, also known as the "majority opinion", an assignment made by the most senior justice in the majority, with the chief justice always being considered the most senior. Drafts of the court's opinion circulate among the justices until the court is prepared to announce the judgment in a particular case.

Justices are free to change their votes on a case up until the decision is finalized and published. In any given case, a justice is free to choose whether or not to author an opinion or else simply join the majority or another justice's opinion. There are several primary types of opinions:
 Opinion of the court: this is the binding decision of the Supreme Court. An opinion that more than half of the justices join (usually at least five justices, since there are nine justices in total; but in cases where some justices do not participate it could be fewer) is known as "majority opinion" and creates binding precedent in American law. Whereas an opinion that fewer than half of the justices join is known as a "plurality opinion" and is only partially binding precedent.
 Concurring: a justice agrees with and joins the majority opinion but authors a separate concurrence to give additional explanations, rationales, or commentary. Concurrences do not create binding precedent.
 Concurring in the judgment: a justice agrees with the outcome the court reached but disagrees with its reasons for doing so. A justice in this situation does not join the majority opinion. Like regular concurrences, these do not create binding precedent.
 Dissent: a justice disagrees with the outcome the court reached and its reasoning. Justices who dissent from a decision may author their own dissenting opinions or, if there are multiple dissenting justices in a decision, may join another justice's dissent. Dissents do not create binding precedent. A justice may also join only part(s) of a particular decision, and may even agree with some parts of the outcome and disagree with others.

It is the court's practice to issue decisions in all cases argued in a particular term by the end of that term. Within that term, the court is under no obligation to release a decision within any set time after oral argument. Since recording devices are banned inside the courtroom of the Supreme Court Building, the delivery of the decision to the media is done via paper copies and is known as the "Running of the Interns".

It is possible that through recusals or vacancies the court divides evenly on a case. If that occurs, then the decision of the court below is affirmed, but does not establish binding precedent. In effect, it results in a return to the status quo ante. For a case to be heard, there must be a quorum of at least six justices. If a quorum is not available to hear a case and a majority of qualified justices believes that the case cannot be heard and determined in the next term, then the judgment of the court below is affirmed as if the court had been evenly divided. For cases brought to the Supreme Court by direct appeal from a United States District Court, the chief justice may order the case remanded to the appropriate U.S. Court of Appeals for a final decision there. This has only occurred once in U.S. history, in the case of United States v. Alcoa (1945).

Published opinions

The court's opinions are published in three stages. First, a slip opinion is made available on the court's web site and through other outlets. Next, several opinions and lists of the court's orders are bound together in paperback form, called a preliminary print of United States Reports, the official series of books in which the final version of the court's opinions appears. About a year after the preliminary prints are issued, a final bound volume of U.S. Reports is issued by the Reporter of Decisions. The individual volumes of U.S. Reports are numbered so that users may cite this set of reports (or a competing version published by another commercial legal publisher but containing parallel citations) to allow those who read their pleadings and other briefs to find the cases quickly and easily. , there are:
 Final bound volumes of U.S. Reports: 569 volumes, covering cases through June 13, 2013 (part of the October 2012 term).
 Slip opinions: 21 volumes (565–585 for 2011–2017 terms, three two-part volumes each), plus part 1 of volume 586 (2018 term).

, the U.S. Reports have published a total of 30,161 Supreme Court opinions, covering the decisions handed down from February 1790 to March 2012. This figure does not reflect the number of cases the court has taken up, as several cases can be addressed by a single opinion (see, for example, Parents v. Seattle, where Meredith v. Jefferson County Board of Education was also decided in the same opinion; by a similar logic, Miranda v. Arizona actually decided not only Miranda but also three other cases: Vignera v. New York, Westover v. United States, and California v. Stewart). A more unusual example is The Telephone Cases, which are a single set of interlinked opinions that take up the entire 126th volume of the U.S. Reports.

Opinions are also collected and published in two unofficial, parallel reporters: Supreme Court Reporter, published by West (now a part of Thomson Reuters), and United States Supreme Court Reports, Lawyers' Edition (simply known as Lawyers' Edition), published by LexisNexis. In court documents, legal periodicals and other legal media, case citations generally contain cites from each of the three reporters; for example, citation to Citizens United v. Federal Election Commission is presented as Citizens United v. Federal Election Com'n, 585 U.S. 50, 130 S. Ct. 876, 175 L. Ed. 2d 753 (2010), with "S. Ct." representing the Supreme Court Reporter, and "L. Ed." representing the Lawyers' Edition.

Citations to published opinions

Optionally,  is used to "pinpoint" to a specific page number within the opinion. For instance, the citation for Roe v. Wade is 410 U.S. 113 (1973), which means the case was decided in 1973 and appears on page 113 of volume 410 of U.S. Reports. For opinions or orders that have not yet been published in the preliminary print, the volume and page numbers may be replaced with ___

Institutional powers

The federal court system and the judicial authority to interpret the Constitution received little attention in the debates over the drafting and ratification of the Constitution. The power of judicial review, in fact, is nowhere mentioned in it. Over the ensuing years, the question of whether the power of judicial review was even intended by the drafters of the Constitution was quickly frustrated by the lack of evidence bearing on the question either way. Nevertheless, the power of judiciary to overturn laws and executive actions it determines are unlawful or unconstitutional is a well-established precedent. Many of the Founding Fathers accepted the notion of judicial review; in Federalist No. 78, Alexander Hamilton wrote: "A Constitution is, in fact, and must be regarded by the judges, as a fundamental law. It therefore belongs to them to ascertain its meaning, and the meaning of any particular act proceeding from the legislative body. If there should happen to be an irreconcilable variance between the two, that which has the superior obligation and validity ought, of course, to be preferred; or, in other words, the Constitution ought to be preferred to the statute."

The Supreme Court firmly established its power to declare laws unconstitutional in Marbury v. Madison (1803), consummating the American system of checks and balances. In explaining the power of judicial review, Chief Justice John Marshall stated that the authority to interpret the law was the particular province of the courts, part of the duty of the judicial department to say what the law is. His contention was not that the court had privileged insight into constitutional requirements, but that it was the constitutional duty of the judiciary, as well as the other branches of government, to read and obey the dictates of the Constitution.

Since the founding of the republic, there has been a tension between the practice of judicial review and the democratic ideals of egalitarianism, self-government, self-determination and freedom of conscience. At one pole are those who view the federal judiciary and especially the Supreme Court as being "the most separated and least checked of all branches of government." Indeed, federal judges and justices on the Supreme Court are not required to stand for election by virtue of their tenure "during good behavior", and their pay may "not be diminished" while they hold their position (Section 1 of Article Three). Although subject to the process of impeachment, only one justice has ever been impeached and no Supreme Court justice has been removed from office. At the other pole are those who view the judiciary as the least dangerous branch, with little ability to resist the exhortations of the other branches of government.

Constraints
The Supreme Court cannot directly enforce its rulings; instead, it relies on respect for the Constitution and for the law for adherence to its judgments. One notable instance of nonacquiescence came in 1832, when the state of Georgia ignored the Supreme Court's decision in Worcester v. Georgia. President Andrew Jackson, who sided with the Georgia courts, is supposed to have remarked, "John Marshall has made his decision; now let him enforce it!" Some state governments in the South also resisted the desegregation of public schools after the 1954 judgment Brown v. Board of Education. More recently, many feared that President Nixon would refuse to comply with the court's order in United States v. Nixon (1974) to surrender the Watergate tapes. Nixon ultimately complied with the Supreme Court's ruling.

Supreme Court decisions can be purposefully overturned by constitutional amendment, something that has happened on six occasions:
 Chisholm v. Georgia (1793) – overturned by the Eleventh Amendment (1795)
 Dred Scott v. Sandford (1857) – overturned by the Thirteenth Amendment (1865) and the Fourteenth Amendment (1868)
 Pollock v. Farmers' Loan & Trust Co. (1895) – overturned by the Sixteenth Amendment (1913)
 Minor v. Happersett (1875) – overturned by the Nineteenth Amendment (1920)
 Breedlove v. Suttles (1937) – overturned by the Twenty-fourth Amendment (1964)
 Oregon v. Mitchell (1970) – overturned by the Twenty-sixth Amendment (1971)

When the court rules on matters involving the interpretation of laws rather than of the Constitution, simple legislative action can reverse the decisions (for example, in 2009 Congress passed the Lilly Ledbetter Fair Pay Act of 2009, superseding the limitations given in Ledbetter v. Goodyear Tire & Rubber Co. in 2007). Also, the Supreme Court is not immune from political and institutional consideration: lower federal courts and state courts sometimes resist doctrinal innovations, as do law enforcement officials.

In addition, the other two branches can restrain the court through other mechanisms. Congress can increase the number of justices, giving the president power to influence future decisions by appointments (as in Roosevelt's Court Packing Plan discussed above). Congress can pass legislation that restricts the jurisdiction of the Supreme Court and other federal courts over certain topics and cases: this is suggested by language in Section 2 of Article Three, where the appellate jurisdiction is granted "with such Exceptions, and under such Regulations as the Congress shall make." The court sanctioned such congressional action in the Reconstruction Era case ex parte McCardle (1869), although it rejected Congress' power to dictate how particular cases must be decided in United States v. Klein (1871).

On the other hand, through its power of judicial review, the Supreme Court has defined the scope and nature of the powers and separation between the legislative and executive branches of the federal government; for example, in United States v. Curtiss-Wright Export Corp. (1936), Dames & Moore v. Regan (1981), and notably in Goldwater v. Carter (1979), which effectively gave the presidency the power to terminate ratified treaties without the consent of Congress. The court's decisions can also impose limitations on the scope of Executive authority, as in Humphrey's Executor v. United States (1935), the Steel Seizure Case (1952), and United States v. Nixon (1974).

Law clerks

Each Supreme Court justice hires several law clerks to review petitions for writ of certiorari, research them, prepare bench memorandums, and draft opinions. Associate justices are allowed four clerks. The chief justice is allowed five clerks, but Chief Justice Rehnquist hired only three per year, and Chief Justice Roberts usually hires only four. Generally, law clerks serve a term of one to two years.

The first law clerk was hired by Associate Justice Horace Gray in 1882. Oliver Wendell Holmes Jr. and Louis Brandeis were the first Supreme Court justices to use recent law school graduates as clerks, rather than hiring "a stenographer-secretary." Most law clerks are recent law school graduates.

The first female clerk was Lucile Lomen, hired in 1944 by Justice William O. Douglas. The first African-American, William T. Coleman Jr., was hired in 1948 by Justice Felix Frankfurter. A disproportionately large number of law clerks have obtained law degrees from elite law schools, especially Harvard, Yale, the University of Chicago, Columbia, and Stanford. From 1882 to 1940, 62% of law clerks were graduates of Harvard Law School. Those chosen to be Supreme Court law clerks usually have graduated in the top of their law school class and were often an editor of the law review or a member of the moot court board. By the mid-1970s, clerking previously for a judge in a federal court of appeals had also become a prerequisite to clerking for a Supreme Court justice.

Ten Supreme Court justices previously clerked for other justices: Byron White for Frederick M. Vinson, John Paul Stevens for Wiley Rutledge, William Rehnquist for Robert H. Jackson, Stephen Breyer for Arthur Goldberg, John Roberts for William Rehnquist, Elena Kagan for Thurgood Marshall, Neil Gorsuch for both Byron White and Anthony Kennedy, Brett Kavanaugh also for Kennedy, Amy Coney Barrett for Antonin Scalia, and Ketanji Brown Jackson for Stephen Breyer. Justices Gorsuch and Kavanaugh served under Kennedy during the same term. Gorsuch is the first justice to clerk for and subsequently serve alongside the same justice, serving alongside Kennedy from April 2017 through Kennedy's retirement in 2018. With the confirmation of Justice Kavanaugh, for the first time a majority of the Supreme Court was composed of former Supreme Court law clerks (Roberts, Breyer, Kagan, Gorsuch and Kavanaugh, now joined by Barrett and Jackson).

Several current Supreme Court justices have also clerked in the federal courts of appeals: John Roberts for Judge Henry Friendly of the United States Court of Appeals for the Second Circuit, Justice Samuel Alito for Judge Leonard I. Garth of the United States Court of Appeals for the Third Circuit, Elena Kagan for Judge Abner J. Mikva of the United States Court of Appeals for the District of Columbia Circuit, Neil Gorsuch for Judge David B. Sentelle of the United States Court of Appeals for the District of Columbia, Brett Kavanaugh for Judge Walter Stapleton of the United States Court of Appeals for the Third Circuit and Judge Alex Kozinski of the United States Court of Appeals for the Ninth Circuit, and Amy Coney Barrett for Judge Laurence Silberman of the U.S. Court of Appeals for the D.C. Circuit.

Politicization of the court
Clerks hired by each of the justices of the Supreme Court are often given considerable leeway in the opinions they draft. "Supreme Court clerkship appeared to be a nonpartisan institution from the 1940s into the 1980s," according to a study published in 2009 by the law review of Vanderbilt University Law School. "As law has moved closer to mere politics, political affiliations have naturally and predictably become proxies for the different political agendas that have been pressed in and through the courts," former federal court of appeals judge J. Michael Luttig said. David J. Garrow, professor of history at the University of Cambridge, stated that the court had thus begun to mirror the political branches of government. "We are getting a composition of the clerk workforce that is getting to be like the House of Representatives," Professor Garrow said. "Each side is putting forward only ideological purists."

According to the Vanderbilt Law Review study, this politicized hiring trend reinforces the impression that the Supreme Court is "a superlegislature responding to ideological arguments rather than a legal institution responding to concerns grounded in the rule of law." A poll conducted in June 2012 by The New York Times and CBS News showed just 44% of Americans approve of the job the Supreme Court is doing. Three-quarters said justices' decisions are sometimes influenced by their political or personal views. One study, using four-year panel data, found that public opinion of the Supreme Court was highly stable over time.

Criticism and controversies
The Supreme Court has been the object of criticisms and controversies on a range of issues. Among them:

Democratic backsliding 

Thomas Keck argues that the Supreme Court has rarely provided an effective check against democratic abuses, especially at five major constitutional crises throughout US History, and finds signs that the Roberts Court seems to play an even more damaging role than most of its predecessors in undermining American democracy. He contends that Americans may already have permanent minority rule, but that a win for the independent state legislature theory in Moore v. Harper would confirm the need for court packing to try and save American democracy. Aziz Z. Huq argues that by blocking progress of democratizing institutions, increasing the disparity in wealth and power, and empowering an authoritarian white nationalist movement, that the Supreme Court has already created a "permanent minority" that is incapable of democratic defeat.

Gifts and outside income
The 21st century has seen increased scrutiny of justices accepting expensive gifts and travel. All of the members of the Roberts Court have accepted travel or gifts. In 2012, Justice Sonia Sotomayor received $1.9million in advances from her publisher Knopf Doubleday. Justice Scalia and others took dozens of expensive trips to exotic locations paid for by private donors. Private events sponsored by partisan groups that are attended by both the justices and those who have an interest in their decisions have raised concerns about access and inappropriate communications. In 2016, Stephen Spaulding, the legal director at Common Cause, said: "There are fair questions raised by some of these trips about their commitment to being impartial."

Subsequent to news reports of undue influence finessed through donations to the Supreme Court Historical Society, published during the previous summer; on December 8, 2022, the House Committee on the Judiciary convened a hearing to determine covert activity and influence on SCOTUS members by the Faith and Action (now Faith and Liberty) group, entitled "Undue Influence: Operation Higher Court and Politicking at SCOTUS", at which Donald K. Sherman, chief counsel for watchdog group Citizens for Responsibility and Ethics in Washington (CREW), testified to the inherent danger of wealthy activists accessing and influencing justices, noting that Supreme Court justices are not subject to the gift bans applied to lower court judges, so that justices are "accepting gifts based on whether they choose to accept them or not".

Additional concerns have been raised at the potential conflict of Justices being swayed through their spouses' method of income and connection to cases, as a majority of the information is redacted from the Justice's ethical disclosure forms.

Increasing partisanship 
Unlike constitutional courts in most democracies and contrary to the ideal taught in civics classes, the U.S. Supreme Court appears to be an increasingly partisan institution. The partisan refusal to act on the nomination of Merrick Garland, citing a presidential election that was eight months away, together with the same partisan majority expediting the nomination of Amy Coney Barrett held less than 2 months before the 2020 presidential election four years later, showed that the Senate deems the institution to be of partisan importance. Further evidence of partisanship can be found in the sinking confidence ratings for the Court among Independents (25%) and Democrats (13%) in the 2022 Gallup poll. Lastly,  FiveThirtyEight found the number of unanimous decisions dropped from the 20-year average of nearly 50% to nearly 30% in 2021 while party-line rulings increased from a 60-year average just above zero to a record high 21%.

Individual rights
Court decisions have been criticized for failing to protect individual rights: the Dred Scott (1857) decision upheld slavery; Plessy v. Ferguson (1896) upheld segregation under the doctrine of separate but equal; Kelo v. City of New London (2005) was criticized by prominent politicians, including New Jersey governor Jon Corzine, as undermining property rights. Some critics suggest the 2009 bench with a conservative majority has "become increasingly hostile to voters" by siding with Indiana's voter identification laws which tend to "disenfranchise large numbers of people without driver's licenses, especially poor and minority voters", according to one report. Senator Al Franken criticized the court for "eroding individual rights." However, others argue that the court is too protective of some individual rights, particularly those of people accused of crimes or in detention. For example, Chief Justice Warren Burger was an outspoken critic of the exclusionary rule, and Justice Scalia criticized the court's decision in Boumediene v. Bush for being too protective of the rights of Guantanamo detainees, on the grounds that habeas corpus was "limited" to sovereign territory.

Judicial activism
The Supreme Court has been criticized for not keeping within Constitutional bounds by engaging in judicial activism, rather than merely interpreting law and exercising judicial restraint. Claims of judicial activism are not confined to any particular ideology. An often cited example of conservative judicial activism is the 1905 decision in Lochner v. New York, which has been criticized by many prominent thinkers, including Robert Bork, Justice Antonin Scalia, and Chief Justice John Roberts, and which was reversed in the 1930s.

An often cited example of liberal judicial activism is Roe v. Wade (1973), which legalized abortion on the basis of the "right to privacy" inferred from the Fourteenth Amendment, a reasoning that some critics argued was circuitous, and the case was overturned by Dobbs v. Jackson (2022). Legal scholars, justices, and presidential candidates have criticized the Roe decision.

The progressive Brown v. Board of Education decision banning racial segregation in public schools has been criticized by conservatives such as Patrick Buchanan, former associate justice nominee and solicitor general Robert Bork and former presidential contender Barry Goldwater.

More recently, Citizens United v. Federal Election Commission was criticized for expanding upon the precedent in First National Bank of Boston v. Bellotti (1978) that the First Amendment applies to corporations President Abraham Lincoln warned, referring to the Dred Scott decision, that if government policy became "irrevocably fixed by decisions of the Supreme Court... the people will have ceased to be their own rulers." Former justice Thurgood Marshall justified judicial activism with these words: "You do what you think is right and let the law catch up."

During different historical periods, the court has leaned in different directions. Critics from both sides complain that activist judges abandon the Constitution and substitute their own views instead. Critics include writers such as Andrew Napolitano, Phyllis Schlafly, Mark R. Levin, Mark I. Sutherland, and James MacGregor Burns. Past presidents from both parties have attacked judicial activism, including Franklin D. Roosevelt, Richard Nixon, and Ronald Reagan. Failed Supreme Court nominee Robert Bork wrote: "What judges have wrought is a coup d'état,– slow-moving and genteel, but a coup d'état nonetheless." Brian Leiter wrote that "Given the complexity of the law and the complexity involved in saying what really happened in a given dispute, all judges, and especially those on the Supreme Court, often have to exercise a quasi-legislative power," and "Supreme Court nominations are controversial because the court is a super-legislature, and because its moral and political judgments are controversial."

Judicial interference in political disputes
Some Court decisions have been criticized for injecting the court into the political arena, and deciding questions that are the purview of the other two branches of government. The Bush v. Gore decision, in which the Supreme Court intervened in the 2000 presidential election and effectively chose George W. Bush over Al Gore, has been criticized extensively, particularly by liberals. Another example are Court decisions on apportionment and re-districting: in Baker v. Carr, the court decided it could rule on apportionment questions; Justice Frankfurter in a "scathing dissent" argued against the court wading into so-called political questions.

Lack of accountability 
The ethics rules guiding the court's members are set and enforced by the justices, meaning the members of the court have no external checks on their behavior other than the impeachment of a justice by Congress. Lower courts, by contrast, discipline according to the 1973 Code of Conduct for U.S. judges which is enforced by the Judicial Conduct and Disability Act of 1980. The lack of external enforcement of ethics or other conduct violations makes the Supreme Court an extreme outlier in modern organizational best-practices.

Lifetime tenure
Critic Larry Sabato wrote: "The insularity of lifetime tenure, combined with the appointments of relatively young attorneys who give long service on the bench, produces senior judges representing the views of past generations better than views of the current day." Sanford Levinson has been critical of justices who stayed in office despite medical deterioration based on longevity. James MacGregor Burns stated lifelong tenure has "produced a critical time lag, with the Supreme Court institutionally almost always behind the times." Proposals to solve these problems include term limits for justices, as proposed by Levinson and Sabato and a mandatory retirement age proposed by Richard Epstein, among others. However, others suggest lifetime tenure brings substantial benefits, such as impartiality and freedom from political pressure. Alexander Hamilton in Federalist 78 wrote "nothing can contribute so much to its firmness and independence as permanency in office."

Not choosing enough cases to review
Senator Arlen Specter said the court should "decide more cases"; on the other hand, although Justice Scalia acknowledged in a 2009 interview that the number of cases that the court heard then was smaller than when he first joined the Supreme Court, he also stated that he had not changed his standards for deciding whether to review a case, nor did he believe his colleagues had changed their standards. He attributed the high volume of cases in the late 1980s, at least in part, to an earlier flurry of new federal legislation that was making its way through the courts.

Power excess
This criticism is related to complaints about judicial activism. George Will wrote that the court has an "increasingly central role in American governance." It was criticized for intervening in bankruptcy proceedings regarding ailing carmaker Chrysler Corporation in 2009. A reporter wrote that "Justice Ruth Bader Ginsburg's intervention in the Chrysler bankruptcy" left open the "possibility of further judicial review" but argued overall that the intervention was a proper use of Supreme Court power to check the executive branch. Warren E. Burger, before becoming Chief Justice, argued that since the Supreme Court has such "unreviewable power", it is likely to "self-indulge itself", and unlikely to "engage in dispassionate analysis." Larry Sabato wrote "excessive authority has accrued to the federal courts, especially the Supreme Court."

The 2021–2022 term of the court was the first full term following the appointment of three judges by Republican president Donald Trump — Neil Gorsuch, Brett Kavanaugh, and Amy Coney Barrett — which created a six-strong conservative majority on the court. Subsequently, at the end of the term, the court issued a number of decisions that favored this conservative majority while significantly changing the landscape with respect to rights. These included Dobbs v. Jackson Women's Health Organization which overturned Roe v. Wade and Planned Parenthood v. Casey in recognizing abortion is not a constitutional right, New York State Rifle & Pistol Association, Inc. v. Bruen which made public possession of guns a protected right under the Second Amendment, Carson v. Makin and Kennedy v. Bremerton School District which both weakened the Establishment Clause separating church and state, and West Virginia v. EPA which weakened the power of executive branch agencies to interpret their congressional mandate. Several observers considered this a shift of government power into the Supreme Court, and a "judicial coup" by some members of Congress including Representative Alexandria Ocasio-Cortez, urging action to reform the Supreme Court.

Secretive proceedings

The court has been criticized for keeping its deliberations hidden from public view. For example, the increasing use of a 'shadow docket' facilitates the court making decisions in secret without hearing oral arguments or giving an explanation regarding its ruling. According to a review of Jeffrey Toobin's 2007 book The Nine: Inside the Secret World of the Supreme Court; "Its inner workings are difficult for reporters to cover, like a closed 'cartel', only revealing itself through 'public events and printed releases, with nothing about its inner workings.'" The reviewer writes: "few (reporters) dig deeply into court affairs. It all works very neatly; the only ones hurt are the American people, who know little about nine individuals with enormous power over their lives." A Fairleigh Dickinson University poll conducted in 2010 found that 61% of American voters agreed that televising Court hearings would "be good for democracy", and 50% of voters stated they would watch Court proceedings if they were televised.

Selection biases 

The electoral college (which elects the President who nominates the justices) and the US Senate which confirms the justices, both have biases that, for example, currently favor republicans, making it likely those biases have been transferred to what was in 2018, the most conservative Supreme Court since FDR's first term.

In addition, the Federalist Society acted as a filter for judicial nominations during the Trump administration, ensuring the latest conservative justices lean even further to the right. David Litt critiques it as "an attempt to impose rigid ideological dogma on a profession once known for intellectual freedom."

State vs. federal power debate
There has been debate throughout American history about the boundary between federal and state power. While Framers such as James Madison and Alexander Hamilton argued in The Federalist Papers that their then-proposed Constitution would not infringe on the power of state governments, others argue that expansive federal power is good and consistent with the Framers' wishes. The Tenth Amendment to the United States Constitution explicitly grants "powers not delegated to the United States by the Constitution, nor prohibited by it to the States, are reserved to the States respectively, or to the people."

The court has been criticized for giving the federal government too much power to interfere with state authority. One criticism is that it has allowed the federal government to misuse the Commerce Clause by upholding regulations and legislation which have little to do with interstate commerce, but that were enacted under the guise of regulating interstate commerce; and by voiding state legislation for allegedly interfering with interstate commerce. For example, the Commerce Clause was used by the Fifth Circuit Court of Appeals to uphold the Endangered Species Act, thus protecting six endemic species of insect near Austin, Texas, despite the fact that the insects had no commercial value and did not travel across state lines; the Supreme Court let that ruling stand without comment in 2005. Chief Justice John Marshall asserted Congress's power over interstate commerce was "complete in itself, may be exercised to its utmost extent, and acknowledges no limitations, other than are prescribed in the Constitution." Justice Alito said congressional authority under the Commerce Clause is "quite broad"; modern-day theorist Robert B. Reich suggests debate over the Commerce Clause continues today.

Advocates of states' rights such as constitutional scholar Kevin Gutzman have also criticized the court, saying it has misused the Fourteenth Amendment to undermine state authority. Justice Brandeis, in arguing for allowing the states to operate without federal interference, suggested that states should be laboratories of democracy. One critic wrote "the great majority of Supreme Court rulings of unconstitutionality involve state, not federal, law." Others see the Fourteenth Amendment as a positive force that extends "protection of those rights and guarantees to the state level." More recently, the issue of federal power is central in the prosecution of Gamble v. United States, which is examining the doctrine of "separate sovereigns", whereby a criminal defendant can be prosecuted by a state court and then by a federal court.

Too slow 
British constitutional scholar Adam Tomkins sees flaws in the American system of having courts (and specifically the Supreme Court) act as checks on the Executive and Legislative branches; he argues that because the courts must wait, sometimes for years, for cases to navigate their way through the system, their ability to restrain other branches is severely weakened. In contrast, various other countries have a dedicated constitutional court that has original jurisdiction on constitutional claims brought by persons or political institutions; for example, the Federal Constitutional Court of Germany, which can declare a law unconstitutional when challenged.

Too small 

The U.S. Supreme Court is the smallest (9 justices) of any major nation and could be expanded without a constitutional amendment. Some have argued that 9 justices is too small a number to represent the perspectives of more than 300 million people, and that the number of seats on the Supreme Court should be expanded, with Jonathan Turley, advocating for 19 justices.

See also

 Judicial appointment history for United States federal courts
 List of courts which publish audio or video of arguments
 List of presidents of the United States by judicial appointments
 Lists of United States Supreme Court cases
 List of supreme courts by country
 List of pending United States Supreme Court cases
 Oyez Project
 Reporter of Decisions of the Supreme Court of the United States

Selected landmark Supreme Court decisions

 Marbury v. Madison (1803, judicial review)
 McCulloch v. Maryland (1819, implied powers)
 Gibbons v. Ogden (1824, interstate commerce)
 Dred Scott v. Sandford (1857, slavery)
 Plessy v. Ferguson (1896, separate but equal treatment of races)
 Wickard v. Filburn (1942, federal regulation of economic activity)
 Brown v. Board of Education (1954, school segregation of races)
 Engel v. Vitale (1962, state-sponsored prayers in public schools)
 Abington School District v. Schempp (1963, Bible readings and recitation of the Lord's prayer in U.S. public schools)
 Gideon v. Wainwright (1963, right to an attorney)
 Griswold v. Connecticut (1965, contraception)
 Miranda v. Arizona (1966, rights of those detained by police)
 In re Gault (1967, rights of juvenile suspects)
 Loving v. Virginia (1967, interracial marriage)
 Lemon v. Kurtzman (1971, religious activities in public schools)
 New York Times Co. v. United States (1971, freedom of the press)
 Eisenstadt v. Baird (1972, privacy for unmarried people)
 Roe v. Wade (1973, abortion)
 Miller v. California (1973, obscenity)
 United States v. Nixon (1974, executive privilege)
 Buckley v. Valeo (1976, campaign finance)
 Bowers v. Hardwick (1986, sodomy)
 Bush v. Gore (2000, presidential election)
 Lawrence v. Texas (2003, sodomy)
 District of Columbia v. Heller (2008, gun rights)
 Citizens United v. FEC (2010, campaign finance)
 United States v. Windsor (2013, same-sex marriage)
 Shelby County v. Holder (2013, voting rights)
 Obergefell v. Hodges (2015, same-sex marriage)
 Bostock v. Clayton County (2020, discrimination on LGBT workers)
 McGirt v. Oklahoma (2020,  tribal reservation rights)
 Dobbs v. Jackson Women's Health Organization (2022, abortion)

References

Bibliography

 Encyclopedia of the Supreme Court of the United States, 5 vols., Detroit [etc.]  Macmillan Reference USA, 2008
 The Rules of the Supreme Court of the United States  (2013 ed.) (PDF).
 Biskupic, Joan and Elder Witt (1997). Congressional Quarterly's Guide to the U.S. Supreme Court. Washington, D.C.: Congressional Quarterly. 
 
 
 Harvard Law Review Assn. (2000). The Bluebook: A Uniform System of Citation, 17th ed. [18th ed., 2005. ]
 Irons, Peter (1999). A People's History of the Supreme Court. New York: Viking Press. .
 Rehnquist, William (1987). The Supreme Court. New York: Alfred A. Knopf. .
 Skifos, Catherine Hetos (1976). "The Supreme Court Gets a Home", Supreme Court Historical Society 1976 Yearbook. [in 1990, renamed The Journal of Supreme Court History (ISSN 1059-4329)]
 
 Warren, Charles (1924). The Supreme Court in United States History (3 volumes). Boston: Little, Brown and Co.
 Woodward, Bob and Armstrong, Scott (1979). The Brethren: Inside the Supreme Court. .

Further reading

 
 Beard, Charles A. (1912). The Supreme Court and the Constitution. New York: Macmillan Company. Reprinted Dover Publications, 2006. .
 Corley, Pamela C.; Steigerwalt, Amy; Ward, Artemus (2013). The Puzzle of Unanimity: Consensus on the United States Supreme Court. Stanford University Press. .
 Cushman, Barry (1998). Rethinking the New Deal Court. Oxford University Press.
 
 
 Garner, Bryan A. (2004). Black's Law Dictionary. Deluxe 8th ed. Thomson West. .
 Greenburg, Jan Crawford (2007). Supreme Conflict: The Inside Story of the Struggle for Control for the United States Supreme Court. New York: Penguin Press. .
 
 
 Lewis, Thomas Tandy, ed. The U.S. Supreme Court (2nd ed.) Three volumes. Ipswich: Salem/Grey House, 2016. .
 McCloskey, Robert G. (2005). The American Supreme Court (4th ed.). Chicago: University of Chicago Press. .
 
 
 
 Toobin, Jeffrey. The Nine: Inside the Secret World of the Supreme Court. Doubleday, 2007. .
 
 Urofsky, Melvin and Finkelman, Paul (2001). A March of Liberty: A Constitutional History of the United States. Two vols. New York: Oxford University Press.  & .

External links

 
 Supreme Court decisions from World Legal Information Institution (contains no advertisements)
 Supreme Court Collection from the Legal Information Institute
 Supreme Court Opinions from FindLaw
 U.S. Supreme Court Decisions (v. 1+) from Justia, Oyez and U.S. Court Forms
 Supreme Court Records and Briefs from Cornell Law Library
 Milestone Cases in Supreme Court History from InfoPlease
 Supreme Court Nominations, present–1789
 Scales of Justice: The History of Supreme Court Nominations – radio program explores history of appointments and confirmations
 Supreme Court Historical Society
 Complete/Searchable 1991–2004 Opinions and Orders
 The Supreme Court Database A research database with information about cases from 1946 to 2011
 The Oyez Project – audio recordings of oral arguments
 
 U.S. Supreme Court collected news and commentary at The Washington Post
 C-SPAN's The Supreme Court: Home to America's Highest Court
 Supreme Court Briefs Hosted by the American Bar Association
 
 
 

 
1789 establishments in the United States
Courts and tribunals established in 1789
United States, Supreme Court of the